Communications Corporation of America (also known as ComCorp) was a broadcasting company in the United States that owned television stations in smaller markets.  The company was headquartered in Lafayette, Louisiana.  It owned and/or operated 20 stations (counting satellite stations and those controlled via local marketing agreements).  The company began in 1989 and the next year, it purchased three television stations from Southwest MultiMedia Company of Houston: KVEO in Brownsville, KPEJ in Odessa, and KWKT in Waco, and they purchased the license for WPFT in Baton Rouge, LA, which they signed on in 1991 as WGMB.

At one point, ComCorp was also an owner of radio stations in its home market of Lafayette; it subsequently sold those stations to Regent Communications.

In June 2006, ComCorp filed for Chapter 11 bankruptcy.  The company emerged from bankruptcy in October 2007 under the control of Silver Point Capital, who also controlled Granite Broadcasting.

Local news on ComCorp's owned or managed stations are structured variably, with most stations not producing news in-house. As of May 2011, the only ComCorp owned-and-operated stations with in-house local newscasts are KTSM-TV and KETK-TV; two ComCorp managed stations, WVLA-TV and KDBC-TV also produce their own newscasts. Most of the remainder of the company's stations have their newscasts outsourced to other stations in the company portfolio: most of ComCorp's Fox stations in Louisiana and Texas have local newscasts produced by KETK (with the exception of WGMB in Baton Rouge, whose newscasts are produced out of area sister station WVLA); the newscasts for NBC affiliate KVEO-TV in Brownsville, Texas, though are produced by El Paso CBS affiliate KDBC-TV); the remainder of ComCorp's owned and managed stations, including CBS affiliate WEVV-TV (the only Big Three station in the group without any local news), do not carry news at all.

On January 15, 2013, Communications Corporation of America put all of its 25 owned or managed stations up for sale, with investment firm Houlihan Lokey hired to assist in the exploration of sale options. On April 24, ComCorp announced that its entire group would be sold to Nexstar Broadcasting Group; KMSS-TV, KPEJ-TV and most of the ComCorp-managed stations that are owned by White Knight Broadcasting would be sold to Mission Broadcasting while WEVV-TV and White Knight Broadcasting's KSHV-TV would be sold to a female-controlled company called Rocky Creek Communications, with Nexstar assuming operational control of those stations. However, on June 6, 2014, Nexstar announced that it would instead sell KMSS & KPEJ to a new minority-owned company Marshall Broadcasting Group (marking the company's first television station acquisitions) for $58.5 million. Also on August 4, Nexstar announced that it would instead sell WEVV to Bayou City Broadcasting for $18.6 million. Mission & Rocky Creek would later withdraw its applications to acquire KFXK, KSHV & WVLA. The sale was completed on January 1, 2015.

It was the last remaining TV station group that didn't have an ABC affiliate when sold; however, it had temporarily owned and operated current-Fox affiliate WHBQ-TV of Memphis during its last days as an ABC affiliate and managed KAQY in Monroe, Louisiana during its first nine years as an ABC affiliate.

Former stations 
 (**) – Indicates station was built and signed on by ComCorp.
Stations are arranged alphabetically by state and by city of license.

Radio stations

References 

Defunct broadcasting companies of the United States
Defunct companies based in Louisiana
Companies based in Lafayette, Louisiana
Companies that filed for Chapter 11 bankruptcy in 2006
Mass media companies established in 1989
Mass media companies disestablished in 2015
1989 establishments in Louisiana
2015 disestablishments in Louisiana
2015 mergers and acquisitions
Nexstar Media Group